In investment, the bond credit rating represents the credit worthiness of corporate or government bonds.  It is not the same as an individual's credit score. The ratings are published by credit rating agencies and used by investment professionals to assess the likelihood the debt will be repaid.

Credit rating agencies
Credit rating is a highly concentrated industry with the "Big Three" credit rating agencies – Fitch Ratings, Moody's and Standard & Poor's (S&P) – controlling approximately 95% of the ratings business.

Credit rating agencies registered as such with the SEC are "nationally recognized statistical rating organizations". The following firms are currently registered as NRSROs: A.M. Best Company, Inc.; DBRS Ltd.; Egan-Jones Rating Company; Fitch, Inc.; HR Ratings; Japan Credit Rating Agency; Kroll Bond Rating Agency; Moody's Investors Service, Inc.; Rating and Investment Information, Inc.; Morningstar Credit Ratings, LLC; and Standard & Poor's Ratings Services.  

Under the Credit Rating Agency Reform Act, an NRSRO may be registered with respect to up to five classes of credit ratings: (1) financial institutions, brokers, or dealers; (2) insurance companies; (3) corporate issuers; (4) issuers of asset-backed securities; and (5) issuers of government securities, municipal securities, or securities issued by a foreign government.

In Asia, the regulated and recognized credit rating agencies in the domestic markets are – in China: China Chengxin International (CCXI), China Lianhe Credit Rating (Lianhe Ratings), New Century Zixin Assessment Investment Service, Pengyuan Credit Rating; in Japan: Rating and Investment Information (R&I); in India: ICRA (ICRA), Credit Analysis and Research (CARE) and CRISIL.

Credit rating codes and classes
The credit rating is a financial indicator to potential investors of debt securities such as bonds. These are assigned by credit rating agencies such as Moody's, Standard & Poor's, and Fitch, which publish code designations (such as AAA, B, CC) to express their assessment of the risk quality of a bond.  Moody's assigns bond credit ratings of Aaa, Aa, A, Baa, Ba, B, Caa, Ca, C, as well as WR and NR for 'withdrawn' and 'not rated' respectively. Standard & Poor's and Fitch assign bond credit ratings of AAA, AA, A, BBB, BB, B, CCC, CC, C, D.  Currently there are only two companies in the United States with an AAA credit rating:Microsoft and Johnson & Johnson.  These individual codes are grouped into broader classes described as "investment grade" or not, or in numbered tiers from high to low.

In addition to the rating codes, agencies typically supplement the current assessment with indications of the chances for future upgrades or downgrades over the medium term.  For example, Moody's designates an Outlook for a given rating as Positive (POS, likely to upgrade), Negative (NEG, likely to downgrade), Stable (STA, likely to remain unchanged), or Developing (DEV, contingent on some future event).

Rating tier definitions

Investment grade
A bond is considered investment grade or IG if its credit rating is BBB− or higher by Fitch Ratings or S&P, or Baa3 or higher by Moody's, the so-called "Big Three" credit rating agencies. Generally they are bonds that are judged by the rating agency as likely enough to meet payment obligations that banks are allowed to invest in them.

Ratings play a critical role in determining how much companies and other entities that issue debt, including sovereign governments, have to pay to access credit markets, i.e., the amount of interest they pay on their issued debt. The threshold between investment-grade and speculative-grade ratings has important market implications for issuers' borrowing costs. 

Bonds that are not rated as investment-grade bonds are known as high yield bonds or more derisively as junk bonds.

The risks associated with investment-grade bonds (or investment-grade corporate debt) are considered significantly higher than those associated with first-class government bonds. The difference between rates for first-class government bonds and investment-grade bonds is called investment-grade spread. The range of this spread is an indicator of the market's belief in the stability of the economy. The higher these investment-grade spreads (or risk premiums) are, the weaker the economy is considered.

Criticism
Until the early 1970s, bond credit ratings agencies were paid for their work by investors who wanted impartial information on the credit worthiness of securities issuers and their particular offerings.  Starting in the early 1970s, the "Big Three" ratings agencies (S&P, Moody's, and Fitch) began to receive payment for their work by the securities issuers for whom they issue those ratings, which has led to charges that these ratings agencies can no longer always be impartial when issuing ratings for those securities issuers.  Securities issuers have been accused of "shopping" for the best ratings from these three ratings agencies, in order to attract investors, until at least one of the agencies delivers favorable ratings.  This arrangement has been cited as one of the primary causes of the subprime mortgage crisis (which began in 2007), when some securities, particularly mortgage-backed securities (MBSs) and collateralized debt obligations (CDOs) rated highly by the credit ratings agencies, and thus heavily invested in by many organizations and individuals, were rapidly and vastly devalued due to defaults, and fear of defaults, on some of the individual components of those securities, such as home loans and credit card accounts. Other countries are beginning to mull the creation of domestic credit ratings agencies to challenge the dominance of the "Big Three", for example in Russia, where the ACRA was founded in 2016.

Municipal bonds
Municipal bonds are instruments issued by local, state, or federal governments in the United States. Until April–May 2010, Moody's and Fitch were rating municipal bonds on the separate naming/classification system which mirrored the tiers for corporate bonds. S&P abolished its dual rating system in 2000.

Default rates 
The historical default rate for municipal bonds is lower than that of corporate bonds. A potential misuse of historic default statistics is to assume that historical average default rates represent the "probability of default" of debt in a particular rating category. However, [...] default rates can vary significantly from one year to the next and the observed rate for any given year can vary significantly from the average.

AAA Rating 
AAA is the highest credit rating that any of the major credit rating agencies can give to an issuer's bonds.

AAA Rated Bonds 
AAA-rated bonds have a high credit rating because their issuers are able to meet their financial obligations with ease and have the lowest risk of default.

See also
 Credit risk
 Default (finance)
 List of countries by credit rating

References

External links
 "What Is A Corporate Credit Rating?", Investopedia.com
 Investment Grade Real Estate | How To Purchase Property With Credit Rated Tenants
 "As company priorities shift, fewer get AAA debt rating," USA Today (Mar 2005)
 "Fitch says confident in 'AAA' subprime ratings", Reuters (Jul 2007)

Bond market
Investment
Credit rating
Credit risk
Bond valuation
de:Rating#Ratingcodes